Whiteface is an unincorporated community in Cotton Township, Saint Louis County, Minnesota, United States.

The community is located 6 miles east of Cotton at the intersection of Saint Louis County Road 52 (Comstock Lake Road) and County Road 224 (Mink Road).

Whiteface is located within the Cloquet Valley State Forest of Saint Louis County.

The Whiteface River flows through the community.

References

Official State of Minnesota Highway Map – 2011/2012 edition

Unincorporated communities in Minnesota
Unincorporated communities in St. Louis County, Minnesota